Virginia Park is a neighbourhood in north east Edmonton, Alberta, Canada.  It is located between the North Saskatchewan River valley to the south and Northlands Park to the north.  Its eastern boundary overlooks Wayne Gretzky Drive.  Its western boundary is a jagged line running south along the western edge of Borden Park (78 Street), then east along 112 Avenue, then south along 76 Street to the river valley.

Two notable features of the neighbourhood are Borden Park and Concordia University of Edmonton

In addition to Concordia University of Edmonton, Virginia Park Elementary School is also located in Virginia Park. Concordia High School was formerly located north of the university campus.

The area was originally subdivided prior to World War I, however, three out of four private dwellings data from after the end of World War II. Most dwellings are either walk-up apartments in buildings with fewer than five stories or single-family dwellings. While many single-family dwellings are owner-occupied, over 50% of the residences in Virginia Park are rented.

Demographics 

References

External links 
 Concordia University College

Neighbourhoods in Edmonton